Ayn al-Bayda is a village in northern Aleppo Governorate, northern Syria.

With 1,111 inhabitants, as per the 2004 census, Ayn al-Bayda administratively belongs to Nahiya Jarabulus within Jarabulus District. Nearby localities include Amarnah  to the northeast, Mazaalah  to the northwest, and Dabis  to the southwest.

References

Villages in Aleppo Governorate